Gravity Games Bike: Street Vert Dirt is a sports video game developed and published by Midway for the PlayStation 2 and the Xbox. It was released in North America on June 28, 2002 for the PlayStation 2 and on September 4, 2002 for the Xbox. It was the first, last and only game released under the Gravity Games license by Midway.

The game garnered mostly negative reception from critics. Reviewers criticized the game's broken gameplay, graphical glitches and collision detection problems. Some critics, however, praised the game's large level designs. It is considered to be one of the worst video games of all time.

Gameplay 

Gravity Games Bike is a BMX video game and features gameplay similar to that of the Dave Mirra Freestyle BMX games. It features 21 characters and 10 levels. The player controls a BMX biker and is required to complete various goals within levels to unlock later courses. As the player performs tricks, they gain more points and fulfill requirements in the game. The control scheme is similar to that of the Dave Mirra games in that one button on the controller is used to perform tricks and another is used to modify the trick once it is performed. Unlike other similar games, Gravity Games Bike rewards the same number of points for performing the same trick repeatedly. The game has several different multiplayer modes.

Riders 

 Jamie Bestwick
 Dennis McCoy
 Tim "Fuzzy" Hall
 Andre Ellison
 Leigh Ramsdell
 Reuel Erickson
 Matt Beringer

Development 
Midway announced a partnership with EMAP USA on January 18, 2000, giving them the rights to the Gravity Games license. It began development under the title Gravity Games: Bike and was the first game developed under the license. The name of the game changed to Gravity Games Bike: Street Vert Dirt by August 2001, and IGN noted the game's fluid trick system in one of its initial builds. IGN's Douglass Perry noted Midway's attention to detailed level design in a preview for the game. IGN's Chris Carle previewed the game at E3 2002 and praised the game's level design but criticized the graphics and the slow-moving pace of the game.

Reception 

Both versions of the game were panned by critics and are notable for their negative reception. The GameCube version of the game was canceled due to lower than expected sales for all Midway games, though GameSpot's Jeff Gerstmann attributed the cancellation to its negative reception. The game received the "Worst Game of the Year" award from GameSpot for both its Xbox and PlayStation 2 versions.

The PlayStation 2 version of the received a 24% and a 37% from Metacritic and GameRankings respectively. GameSpy's Miguel Lopez criticized the unresponsive controls, collision detection, and sound design, stating "... Dirt has ...a propensity to live up to its name." IGN's Chris Roper compared it unfavorably to E.T. the Extra-Terrestrial for the Atari 2600, which is often considered one of the worst games of all time. Roper noted that the game was full of glitches and had an unresponsive control scheme. GameSpot's Jeff Gerstmann called the gameplay "broken" and the game itself "unfinished". GameZone's Natalie Romano praised the game's sound selection, level size and character variety, while calling the control scheme "one of the game's major weaknesses."

The Xbox version of the game received a 22.5% from GameRankings, and the criticisms were mostly the same as those seen for the PlayStation 2 version. Jeff Gerstmann criticized the game for its glitches and control issues, and wrote, "Wasn't it canceled?".

References 

2002 video games
Cancelled GameCube games
BMX mass media
BMX video games
Cycling video games
Midway video games
PlayStation 2 games
Video games developed in the United States
Xbox games